This is a list of mayors of Compton, California.

Mayors

While 65% of Compton's residents are Hispanic or Latino American, there is yet to be a Hispanic mayor.

Mayoral races
(winners are in bold)

NOTE: If no incumbent, winner is listed first.
(*) Special election to fill vacancy. Highest vote getter wins, even with less than 50% of vote.

References

 01
Compton, California
Mayors
M